Mucor amphibiorum is a fungus which causes ulcers on the platypus, which can be secondarily infected and potentially fatal. It can also reduce the ability to regulate body temperature. It is currently limited to Tasmania and was first seen in 1982 the Elizabeth River. It belongs to the division Mucoromycota.

References

Fungi of Australia
Mucoraceae